The Federal Correctional Institution, Jesup (FCI Jesup) is a medium-security United States federal prison housing male inmates in Jesup, Georgia. It is operated by the Federal Bureau of Prisons, a division of the United States Department of Justice. It has two adjacent satellite facilities: a low-security facility and a minimum-security prison camp, both housing male offenders.

FCI Jesup is located 65 miles southwest of Savannah and 105 miles northwest of Jacksonville, Florida.

Facility
, the minimum-security camp of FCI Jesup housed about 300 prisoners, consisting of drug addicts and white collar criminals. Ben Reyes, who served time in the camp for bribery and conspiracy, said that the camp was "a more relaxed, more bucolic facility" than the Federal Correctional Complex, Beaumont.

, FCI Jesup houses adult male prisoners in all of its properties. It includes a medium-security facility for 1,150 prisoners. It also has two satellite camps, including a low-security property for 605 prisoners, and a minimum-security property for 150 prisoners.

Notable inmates (current and former)

See also

 List of U.S. federal prisons
 Federal Bureau of Prisons
 Incarceration in the United States

References

External links
 Federal Correctional Complex, Jesup

Buildings and structures in Wayne County, Georgia
Jesup
Prisons in Georgia (U.S. state)